Wolf Röhricht (20 April 1886 – 29 December 1953) was a German painter. His work was part of the painting event in the art competition at the 1928 Summer Olympics.

References

Further reading
 Jung-tschechische Kunst, Wolf Röhricht. Gemälde, Aquarelle, Zeichnungen. 5. Jan. – 3. Febr. 1921. Kestner-Ges. e.V., Hannover 1921.
 Verzeichnis der Sonderausstellung Wolf Röhricht. 15. Jan. – 14. Febr. 1928. Die Galerie [Galerie Ferd. Möller], Berlin 1928.
 Wolf Röhricht, Aquarelle. Niederschlesischen Museum Liegnitz in Verbindung mit dem Kunstring XVIII (Liegnitz) im Kunstverein Niederschlesien. Ausstellung vom 17. bis 31. Jan 1943 im Niederschlesischen Museum Liegnitz. Kunstverein Niederschlesien, [Breslau] 1943.
 Wolfgang Scheffler: Wolf Röhricht. Gedächtnis-Ausstellung. Ölgemälde, Aquarelle. Städtische Galerie, München 1955.
 Ernst Schremmer: Wolf Röhricht – Bilder und Aquarelle. Delp Verlag, München 1978, 
 Wolf Röhricht (1886 Liegnitz – 1953 München). Aquarelle, Grafik. Anläßlich einer Ausstellung der Galerie von Abercron Köln-München. Galerie von Abercron, Köln/ München 1978.
 Mario-Andreas von Lüttichau: Wolf Röhricht. Aquarelle. Hirmer, München 1986, 
 Wolf Röhricht – Aquarelle. Ausstellungskatalog Regionalmuseum Jawor/Polen durch Haus Schlesien. Museum für Landeskunde, Königswinter 1997.
 Peter Mraß, Albrecht Tyrell (texts and editing.): Hochöfen und Häfen. Industriebilder aus Oberschlesien und dem Ruhrgebiet von Wolf Röhricht (1886–1953). Ausstellung im Oberschlesischen Landesmuseum Ratingen-Hösel, 5. Dezember 1999 – 30. April 2000. Oberschlesisches Landesmuseum, Ratingen c.2002.

1886 births
1953 deaths
20th-century German painters
20th-century German male artists
German male painters
Olympic competitors in art competitions
People from Legnica